Tits 'n Ass is the twenty-fifth and final studio album by Dutch rock band Golden Earring, released on 11 May 2012. It was their first studio album since 2003's Millbrook U.S.A., but was not issued in the U.S. It was the group's final album before their 2021 breakup.

Track listing
All songs written by Barry Hay and George Kooymans.

Personnel
 George Kooymans – guitar, vocals
 Rinus Gerritsen – bass, rhythm guitar on "Over the Cliff into the Deep Deep Blue"
 Barry Hay – vocals, Flute
 Cesar Zuiderwijk – drums
 Frank Carillo – guitar,  slide guitar
 Jan Rooymans – keyboards, Hammond B3, backing vocals, tambourine, guitar on "Over the Cliff into the Deep Deep Blue"

Charts

Certifications

References

2012 albums
Golden Earring albums
Albums produced by Chris Kimsey